Zoltán Jelenffy (26 October 1876 – 21 January 1924) was a Hungarian sports shooter. He competed in four events at the 1912 Summer Olympics.

References

1876 births
1924 deaths
Hungarian male sport shooters
Olympic shooters of Hungary
Shooters at the 1912 Summer Olympics
People from Sighetu Marmației
Sportspeople from the Austro-Hungarian Empire